La vera costanza ("True Constancy"), is an operatic dramma giocoso in three acts by Pasquale Anfossi. The comédie larmoyante-influenced Italian libretto was by Francesco Puttini. The opera preceded Joseph Haydn's better known setting of the same libretto by three years.

Performance history
The work was first performed on 2 January 1776 at the Teatro delle Dame, Rome. It was successful and performed widely throughout Europe during the following two decades.

Roles

Synopsis
See synopsis of the Haydn opera.

See also
Anfossi's operas L'avaro and Il curioso indiscreto
Complete list of Anfossi's operas

Sources
Hunter, Mary (1992), 'Vera costanza, La (i)' in The New Grove Dictionary of Opera, ed. Stanley Sadie (London) 

Operas
Drammi giocosi
Italian-language operas
1776 operas
Operas by Pasquale Anfossi